The Vitali Klitschko Bloc (Russian: Блок Виталия Кличко) were two local political coalitions in the capital of Ukraine, Kyiv who contended in two local elections there.

History

2006 Kyiv local election
On 10 December 2005 the parties PORA and Reforms and Order Party agreed to create a bloc "Civic party" PORA-ROP " that would contend in the March 26, 2006 Kyiv City Council elections. The bloc was led by Vitali Klitschko who was at the time a Ukrainian professional boxer and (then the) current WBC heavyweight champion. This union was named the Bloc Vitali Klitschko "PORA-ROP" which won 14 seats in the 2006 election. Klitschko thus became a deputy of the Kyiv City Council in April 2006 The bloc felt apart very soon after the election. During the simultaneous elections for Mayor of Kyiv, Klitschko received 26 percent of votes.

2008 Kyiv local election
During the 2008 Kyiv local election the Vitali Klitschko Bloc was a combination of the parties People's Movement of Ukraine, Political Party "European Capital" and "Ukrainian Social Democrats" and it won 10.61% of the votes and 15 seats in the Kyiv City Council. During the simultaneously held elections for Mayor of Kyiv Klitschko received 17.9 percent of votes.

14 October 2008 Vitali Klitschko announced that participation of his bloc in the then expected to be held 2008 Ukrainian parliamentary election was possible.  He added that a decision on the participation in the race would be definitely taken by the entire political team making up the Bloc of Klitschko, not by him personally. A possible candidate to run with the Vitali Klitschko Bloc in an electoral bloc was the European Party of Ukraine. But the next Ukrainian parliamentary election was held in 2012.

Vitali Klitschko Bloc:
People's Movement of Ukraine
European capital
Ukrainian social-democrats

The party Ukrainian Democratic Alliance for Reform was founded on April 24, 2010, on the basis of the Vitali Klitschko Bloc. This party did participate and won 40 seats in the Ukrainian parliament in the 2012 Ukrainian parliamentary election.

Election results

Kyiv City Council

Verkhovna Rada

References

Defunct political party alliances in Ukraine
Political parties in Kyiv